Honduras competed in the Summer Olympic Games for the first time at the 1968 Summer Olympics in Mexico City, Mexico.

References
Official Olympic Reports

Nations at the 1968 Summer Olympics
1968
1968 in Honduran sport